The International Convention Centre Sydney (ICC Sydney) is an exhibition and convention centre which opened in December 2016, in Sydney, Australia. ICC Sydney has over 70 meeting rooms, three theatres and two formal ballrooms.

ICC Sydney includes convention spaces for 2,500, 1,000 and 750 people. The ICC Exhibition Centre and Entertainment Centre includes  of exhibition space, which can be divided into smaller spaces according to requirements. The first major event held at the newly developed centre was RTX Sydney hosted by Rooster Teeth Productions on 4–5 February 2017.

The ICC Sydney, part of Darling Harbour Live, was developed by a consortium comprising AEG Ogden (now ASM Global) Lend Lease, Capella Capital and Spotless, with AEG Ogden the venue operator.

Location
ICC Sydney is located in the Darling Harbour on the western side of the Sydney central business district.

History and structure
ICC Sydney was designed by two architectural firms, Hassell and Populous. It replaces the former Sydney Convention and Exhibition Centre that was demolished in December 2013. Construction began in early 2014; an estimated  of concrete was used to construct the building.

ICC Sydney is an 1.5 billion development being delivered through a Public Private Partnership (PPP) with the New South Wales Government and Darling Harbour Live (comprising Lend Lease, Hostplus, Capella Capital, AEG Ogden and Spotless). The development of ICC Sydney is part of a broader 3.4 billion works program at Darling Harbour that includes a new 590 room hotel tower (under the Sofitel brand), a residential and commercial development (Darling Square), pedestrian boulevard and improved public domain upgrade. The works also include a reconfiguration of Tumbalong Park to provide an additional  of green space acting as a new adaptable event space.

In accordance with the contractual agreement with Darling Harbour Live and the NSW Government, secured First State Super, an equity partner in the PPP's consortium, as the naming rights sponsor for the venue's 9,000 seat entertainment theatre, which was called "First State Super Theatre". In 2020, following First State's rebrand to Aware Super, the theatre was named Aware Super Theatre.

Construction milestones 
July 2015, ICC Sydney Hotel construction commenced. The hotel consists of 35 storeys and approximately 600 rooms. It is managed by AccorHotels under its Sofitel brand.
September 2015, Topping Out Ceremony for the ICC Sydney Theatre. The ceremony that marked the completion of the concrete pour for the top floor of the ICC Sydney Theatre was attended by NSW Premier Mike Baird and Infrastructure Minister Andrew Constance.

Controversy

The 1989 Sir John Sulman Medal for Public Architecture was awarded to Philip Cox Richardson Taylor Partners as joint winners for Sydney Exhibition Centre, Darling Harbour which was demolished in 2014 to make way for the new development. Architects John Andrews and Philip Cox spoke out over the demolition of the Sydney Convention and Exhibition Centre completed in 1988, criticising the fact that the existing structures had not been incorporated into the new development.

Facilities
ICC Sydney consists of three conjoined key structures: 
Aware Super Theatre (previously known as ICC Sydney Theatre (December 2016 – July 2019) and First State Super Theatre (July 2019 – July 2020))
ICC Sydney Exhibition Centre
ICC Sydney Convention Centre including a number of event spaces such as The Gallery, The Grand Ballroom and Event Deck.

Hosted events
Events held at ICC Sydney include:
 RTX Sydney 2017 
AIPC 2017 Annual Conference 
International Chamber of Commerce World Chambers Federation (ICC WCF) 2017
World Chambers Congress, 2017
Amway China Leadership Seminar, 2017 
Dangerous Woman Tour by Ariana Grande, 8 and 9 September 2017 
 RTX Sydney 2018 
Sibos, 2018 
SMASH! (Sydney Manga and Anime Show), (2018–present)
 Here We Go Again Tour (2018–2019) by Cher, 21 October 2018
 ASAP Live in Sydney, 20 October 2018
Madman Anime Festival Sydney, 2019
Golden Tour by Kylie Minogue, 5 and 6 March 2019
Farewell Yellow Brick Road Tour by Elton John, 21 and 23 December 2019
Hillsong Colour Conference yearly in March.
The Script Greatest Hits Tour, 16 September 2022

Netball
During the 2018 Suncorp Super Netball season, the main theatre hosted two netball matches, one an intra-city derby between Giants Netball and the New South Wales Swifts and the other between the Giants and the West Coast Fever. Despite not being designed with indoor sport in mind, the theatre was utilised by the league due to a lack of stadium availability elsewhere in the city. The venue is unlikely to host netball again, as both clubs will move into a permanent multi-purpose facility at the Sydney Olympic Park Tennis Centre in 2020.

See also

Architecture of Sydney

References

External links

2016 establishments in Australia
Ballrooms in Australia
Buildings and structures in Sydney
Convention centres in Australia
Event venues established in 2016
Tourist attractions in Sydney
Theatres in Sydney
Darling Harbour
Boxing venues in Australia
Netball venues in New South Wales
Giants Netball
Modernist architecture in Australia